Bastilla absentimacula is a moth of the family Noctuidae. It is found from the Indian subregion to Sri Lanka, Andaman Islands, Taiwan, Java and New Guinea.

Description
The wingspan is about 50–60 mm. A pale red-brown moth. Forewings with a broad greyish medial band with a straight dark line on its inner edge and a sinuous line on its outer. There is a slightly oblique and sinuous postmedial line present. A marginal pale specks series and marginal dark specks series also found.
Hindwings pale fuscous. A broad diffused submarginal line can be seen, which is very wide at apex.

The larvae feed on Phyllanthus species.

References

External links

Bastilla (moth)
Moths of Asia
Moths described in 1852